Héroïnes is a 1997 French drama film directed by Gérard Krawczyk and starring Virginie Ledoyen.

Plot
Two best friends, Johanna and Jeanne, live in the small town of Decazeville, a mining town in France. One year at the Miners' Ball, the music group The Sirens perform, of which Johanna and Jeanne are members.

In a spontaneous moment, a new friend of Johanna's (named Luc) discovers Johanna and Jeanne's incredible musical talent and singing ability when they sing a duet together without musical accompaniment.

The two girls begin practicing and recording in a studio together with the help of Luc and an arranger, Jasper, and finally manage to record a tape with a few songs.

A co-worker of Jeanne's joins their team as Jasper's assistant. Just after Luc leaves for Paris to take the tape around to various record companies, the others spot posters for a music contest, but only single artists may enter, and Johanna is chosen by the group to enter.

She appears on live TV and is an instant hit, but with only one problem: as she begins to perform before the cameras, Jasper cuts out her mike and inserts a recording of Jeanne's voice instead.

Everyone except for this small group of insiders believes it's really Johanna singing, and their lives snowball from there.

Cast
Virginie Ledoyen as Johanna 
Maïdi Roth as Jeanne 
Marc Duret as Luc 
Saïd Taghmaoui as JP 
Dominic Gould as Jasper 
Marie Laforêt as Sylvie 
Charlotte de Turckheim as Catherine
Edouard Baer as Francis
Serge Reggiani as Montgolfier
Dominique Besnehard as Eddy
Marie-Laure Denoyel as Mme Bayol
Dominique Lagier as Mme Campergue
François Fehner as Michel
Neige Dolsky as Mme Laubier
Gérard Pollet as Philippe

References

External links

1997 films
Films based on French novels
Films directed by Gérard Krawczyk
French drama films
1997 drama films
1990s French-language films
1990s French films